Blocher may refer to:

Blocher (surname)
Blocher, Indiana, an unincorporated town
Blocher's Run, a stream in the U.S. state of Pennsylvania